Jaqua Township is a township in Cheyenne County, Kansas, USA.  As of the 2000 census, its population was 46.

Geography
According to the USGS, it contains three cemeteries: Jaqua, Zion and Zion Lutheran.

The stream of Cowpe Creek runs through this township.

References
 USGS Geographic Names Information System (GNIS)

External links
 US-Counties.com
 City-Data.com

Townships in Cheyenne County, Kansas
Townships in Kansas